Hanne Skak Jensen (born 29 April 1986) is a Danish former tennis player.

She was Danish No. 2, behind then-world No. 1 Caroline Wozniacki. Jensen won nine doubles events organized by the International Tennis Federation, and was a regular member of Denmark Fed Cup team. Playing for Denmark, she scored two wins and seven losses in singles, and six wins and five losses in doubles.

Hanne Skak Jensen was born to Erik and Karen Jensen, and has a brother, Soren. She began playing tennis aged six and was coached by Michael Mortensen.

ITF finals

Singles: 5 (0–5)

Doubles: 16 (9–7)

References

External links
 
 
 

1986 births
Danish female tennis players
Living people
People from Skanderborg Municipality
Sportspeople from the Central Denmark Region